Z1 TV was a Czech news television owned and operated by J&T Group.

Z1 was the first Czech private 24-hour news channel. Since September 2009, it focused on finance, economic and business news and provided the only continuous business news service in the Czech Republic.

Z1 broadcast live every weekday between 7am and 11pm. Its business and finance news service was supplemented by business talk shows and a daily interview program with high-profile guests. The rest of the program consisted of acquired documentaries and other features. Over the weekend, Z1 broadcast documentaries and life style programs.

Z1 broadcast over DVB-T, DVB-S, DVB-C and IPTV. It could also be viewed online and on mobile phones through a streaming video application.
In cooperation with T-Mobile Czech Republic, Z1 provided daily news SMS and MMS updates to subscribers.

Z1 was operated by První zpravodajská a.s., which holds a license for digital terrestrial television broadcasting in the Czech Republic. První zpravodajská a.s. is owned by J&T Finance Group, one of the leading investment firms in the Central and Eastern Europe region and Russia with diverse portfolio of assets in finance, banking, energy, utilities, real estate and corporate services.

Some of the station's anchors were Jan Zika and Ivana Šalomonová.

References

External links
 
In september Z1 should start in a new shape
Z1 Television launched live broadcast for iPhones
Z1 news in a mobile for free
Z1TV Live Application for iPhones

Television stations in the Czech Republic
Television channels and stations established in 2008